José Moreno Sánchez (born 18 November 1993) is a Spanish professional racing cyclist. He rode at the 2015 UCI Track Cycling World Championships.

References

External links
 

1993 births
Living people
Spanish male cyclists
Place of birth missing (living people)
Cyclists at the 2019 European Games
European Games competitors for Spain
Sportspeople from the Province of Albacete
Cyclists from Castilla-La Mancha